Italo Galbiati (8 August 1937 – 8 March 2023) was an Italian football coach and player. He was a trusted assistant to Fabio Capello having worked with Capello at AC Milan, Roma, Juventus, Real Madrid and England national team. He also managed AC Milan himself on a caretaker basis, and was an assistant manager to Capello with the Russia national team.

Career
Galbiati was born in Milan on 8 August 1937. A midfielder, he played for Inter Milan from 1958 to 1960, only managing to win a single cap, in a Fairs Cup away game against Olympique Lyon. He later served as caretaker for AC Milan during the early 1980s, and then joining Fabio Capello as assistant through all of his managing career. 

Galbiati was described as the 'good cop', when dealing with players, as opposed to Capello's 'bad cop'.

References

  

        
        
        
        

1937 births
2023 deaths
Italian footballers
Footballers from Milan
Association football midfielders
Inter Milan players
Reggina 1914 players
Calcio Lecco 1912 players
Como 1907 players
Italian football managers
A.C. Milan managers
A.S. Roma managers
Juventus F.C. managers
Real Madrid CF managers